Keiran Williams (born 12 April 1997) is a Welsh rugby union player who plays for Ospreys regional team as a centre.

Club career 
Williams made his debut for the Ospreys regional team in 2018 against Zebre having previously played for the Ospreys academy and Neath RFC. A small but powerful centre, he has been favourably compared to former Ospreys and Wales star Scott Gibbs.

International career 
Williams represented Wales as a U20 international.

Williams was selected by Wales for the first time on 17 January 2023, for the upcoming 2023 Six Nations Championship.

References

External links 

Ospreys Player Profile

1997 births
Living people
Ospreys (rugby union) players
Rugby union centres
Rugby union players from Neath
Welsh rugby union players